K2-32 is a G9-type main sequence star slightly smaller and less massive than the sun. Four confirmed transiting exoplanets are known to orbit this star. A study of atmospheric escape from the planet K2-32b caused by high-energy stellar irradiation indicates that the star has always been a very slow rotator.

Planetary system

Discovery
The star K2-32 was initially found to have three transiting planet candidates by Andrew Vanderburg and collaborators in 2016. The innermost planet candidate, at that time, K2-32b was confirmed using radial velocity measurements made with the Keck telescope. Confirmation of planets c and d was made by Sinukoff et al. using adaptive optics imaging and computer analysis to eliminate possible false positives.

The Earth-sized planet K2-32e was discovered and validated by René Heller and team in 2019.

Characteristics
With periods of 4.34, 8.99, 20.66 and 31.71 days the four planets orbits are very close to a 1:2:5:7 orbital resonance chain. The densities of planets b, c, and d are between those of Saturn and Neptune, which suggests large and massive atmospheres. The planet K2-32e with a radius almost identical to that of the Earth is almost certainly a terrestrial planet. All four planets are well inside even the optimistic inner boundary of the habitable zone located at 0.58 astronomical units.

References

External links
 The Extrasolar Planets Encyclopaedia  entry for K2-32b
 The Extrasolar Planets Encyclopaedia  entry for K2-32c
 The Extrasolar Planets Encyclopaedia  entry for K2-32d
 The Extrasolar Planets Encyclopaedia  entry for K2-32e

G-type main-sequence stars
Ophiuchus (constellation)
Planetary systems with four confirmed planets
Planetary transit variables